Pound is a 1970 American comedy film written and directed by Robert Downey Sr. It was based on The Comeuppance, an Off-Off Broadway play written by Downey in 1961. It is about several dogs, along with a Siamese cat and a penguin, at a pound, as they await being euthanised; the animals are played by human actors. The film is best known for marking the acting debut of Downey's son and namesake, then-5-year-old Robert Jr., as Puppy.

Cast

See also
 List of American films of 1970

References

External links
 
 
 POUND: Revisiting A Neglected Cult Classic

1970 films
1970 comedy films
1970s English-language films
Films about dogs
Films directed by Robert Downey Sr.